The 1925 Boston College Eagles football team was an American football team that represented Boston College as an independent during the 1925 college football season. In its seventh season under head coach Frank Cavanaugh, the team compiled a 6–2 record and outscored its opponents by a total of 154 to 54.

Jack Cronin played at the left halfback position.  He later played four years in the National Football League for the Providence Steam Roller. Joe McKenney played at quarterback and later returned as Boston College's head football coach from 1928 to 1934. Jack Donahue was the team captain.

Schedule

References

Boston College
Boston College Eagles football seasons
Boston College Eagles football
1920s in Boston